The Forrest Ministry was the first government ministry in Western Australia, after the inauguration of responsible government. It was in government from 29 December 1890 to 14 February 1901, when it was succeeded by the Throssell Ministry following the 1901 elections.

The members of the Forrest Ministry were:

Notes
 According to Reid & Oliver (1982, p.1), the office of Premier was not provided for in the Constitution Act 1889, which only mention the "principal executive offices of the Government liable to be vacated on political grounds". However, the Governor of Western Australia, Sir William Robinson GCMG, used the courtesy title of Premier to refer to the leader of the Government in public statements, as did the media, and its use was in keeping with that prevalent in other British crown colonies.
 The responsibility for Education lay with the Colonial Secretary in the Forrest Ministry except during the period 19 December 1894 – 28 April 1898. A separate Minister for Education was not re-installed until the Daglish Ministry took office in 1904.
 Three of the ministers were subsequently sworn in for the same substantive role under the Throssell Ministry.

References

  (no ISBN)
 

Western Australian ministries
Ministries of Queen Victoria
Ministries of Edward VII